"Life" is a song by Australian singer Conrad Sewell, written by Sewell, Stuart Crichton and Tommy Lee James. It was released on 10 May 2019 as the third single from his debut studio album, Life (2019).

Music video
The music video for "Life" was directed by Guy Franklin and released on 9 July 2019. Hit Radio said "The clip shows Conrad at his best. Belting out one of his heart wrenching songs and captivating the viewer. The singer is joined by crisp, white clad violinists, completing the stunning yet powerful clip."

Charts

Release history

References 
 

2019 singles
2019 songs
Conrad Sewell songs
Songs written by Conrad Sewell
Songs written by Stuart Crichton
Songs written by Tommy Lee James
Sony Music Australia singles